Sirte Stadium is a multi-purpose stadium in Sirte, Libya.  It is currently used mostly for football matches and is the home ground of Khaleej Sirte.  The stadium holds 2,000 people.

References

External links
Stadium information

Sirte
Football venues in Libya
Multi-purpose stadiums in Libya